A broom (also known in some forms as a broomstick) is a cleaning tool consisting of usually stiff fibers (often made of materials such as plastic, hair, or corn husks) attached to, and roughly parallel to, a cylindrical handle, the broomstick. It is thus a variety of brush with a long handle. It is commonly used in combination with a dustpan.

A distinction is made between a "hard broom" and a "soft broom" and a spectrum in between. Soft brooms are used in some cultures chiefly for sweeping walls of cobwebs and spiders, like a "feather duster", while hard brooms are for rougher tasks like sweeping dirt off sidewalks or concrete floors, or even smoothing and texturing wet concrete. The majority of brooms are somewhere in between, suitable for sweeping the floors of homes and businesses, soft enough to be flexible and to move even light dust, but stiff enough to achieve a firm sweeping action.

The broom is also a symbolic object associated with witchcraft and ceremonial magic.

Etymology 
The word "broom" derives from the name of certain thorny shrubs (Genista and others) used for sweeping. The name of the shrubs began to be used for the household implement in Late Middle English and gradually replaced the earlier besom during the Early Modern English period. The song Buy Broom Buzzems (by William Purvis 1752–1832) still refers to the "broom besom" as one type of besom (i.e. "a besom made from broom").

Flat brooms, made of broom corn, were invented by Shakers in the 19th century with the invention of the broom vice.
A smaller whisk broom or brush is sometimes called a duster.

Manufacture 

In 1797, the quality of brooms changed when Levi Dickenson, a farmer in Hadley, Massachusetts, made a broom for his wife, using the tassels of sorghum, a grain he was growing for the seeds. His wife spread good words around town, creating demand for Dickenson's sorghum brooms. The sorghum brooms held up well, but ultimately, like all brooms, fell apart. Dickenson subsequently invented a machine that would make better brooms, and faster than he could. In 1810, the foot treadle broom machine was invented. This machine played an integral part in the Industrial Revolution.

United States 
One source mentions that the United States had 303 broom factories by 1839 and that the number peaked at 1,039 in 1919. Most of these were in the Eastern United States; during the Great Depression in the 1930s, the number of factories declined to 320 in 1939. The state of Oklahoma became a major center for broom production because broom corn grew especially well there, with The Oklahoma Broom Corn Company opening a factory in El Reno in 1906. Faced with competition from imported brooms and synthetic bristles, most of the factories closed by the 1960s.

Magic 

In the context of witchcraft, broomstick is likely to refer to the broom as a whole, known as a besom. The first known reference to witches flying on broomsticks dates to the 11th-century Islamic traditionalist theologian Ibn Qudamahin his book al-Mughnī ( The Persuader ). The first reference to witches flying on broomsticks in Europe dates to 1453, confessed by the male witch Guillaume Edelin. The concept of a flying ointment used by witches appears at about the same time, recorded in 1456.

In Metro-Goldwyn-Mayer's 1939 film, The Wizard of Oz, the Wicked Witch of the West used a broomstick to fly over Oz. She also used it to skywrite "Surrender Dorothy" above the Emerald City. The Wizard commands Dorothy and her three traveling companions to bring the Wicked Witch's broomstick to him in order to grant their wishes. Dorothy carries it to the Wizard with the Scarecrow, Tin Man, and Lion after the Wicked Witch's death.

In Disney's 1940 film Fantasia, Mickey Mouse, playing The Sorcerer's Apprentice, brings a broom to life to do his chore of filling a well full of water. The broom overdoes its job and when chopped into pieces, each splinter becomes a new broom that flood the room until Yen Sid stops them. This story comes from a poem by Goethe called Der Zauberlehrling ("The Sorcerer's Apprentice"). The Disney brooms have had recurring cameos in Disney media, mostly portrayed as janitors, albeit not out of control or causing chaos such as in the original appearance.

This flight was also in Bedknobs and Broomsticks as well as Hocus Pocus.

In Eswatini (Swaziland), witches' broomsticks are short bundles of sticks tied together without a handle.

Flying brooms play an important role in the fantasy world of Harry Potter, used for transportation as well as for playing the popular airborne game of Quidditch. Flying brooms, along with Flying carpets, are the main means of transportation in the world of Poul Anderson's 
Operation Chaos.

The Flying Broom is a feminist organization in Turkey, deliberately evoking the associations of a Flying Broom with witches.

In wider culture 

 The Métis people of Canada have a broom dancing tradition. There are broom dancing exhibitions where people show off their broom dancing skills. The lively broom dance involves fast footwork and jumping.
 "Jumping the broom" is an African-American wedding tradition that originated in marriages of slaves in the United States in the 19th century. Its revived popularity among African Americans is due to the 1976 novel Roots: The Saga of an American Family. "Jumping the broom" was a marriage tradition in pre-Christian Britain and possibly through wider areas of Europe, such as Scandinavia and the Baltic Germanic tribes. Broom grows widely throughout Europe and Africa.
 During World War II, American submarine crews would tie a broom to their boat's conning tower when returning to port to indicate that they had "swept" the seas clean of enemy shipping. The tradition has been devalued in recent years by submarine crews who fly a broom simply when returning from their boat's shake-down cruise. This tradition may stem from the action of the Dutch admiral Maarten Tromp who tied a broom to his main mast after defeating the British admiral Robert Blake at the Battle of Dungeness in 1652. This has often been interpreted as a message that he would "sweep the British from the seas". This story remains unsubstantiated, but may have its origin in the tradition of hoisting a broom as a sign that a ship was for sale, which seems more likely as Tromp had captured two of Blake's ships in the battle.

Literature 
 In 1701 Jonathan Swift wrote a "Meditation Upon a Broomstick", a parody of Robert Boyle's Occasional Reflections upon Several Subjects:

In J.K. Rowling's Harry Potter novels and film adaptations, broomsticks are a common form of transport for wizards and witches. These are also used for the magical sport of Quidditch, in which players use their broomsticks to fly around a field and shoot goals.

Politics

It is used as a symbol of the following political parties:
 Aam Aadmi Party, India
 All Progressives Congress, Nigeria

Religion 
 In Jainism, monks and nuns have a little broom with them, in order to gently brush aside ants and small animals, to avoid crushing them. This is part of observing the principle of Ahinsā.
 The Shakers are often credited with the invention of the flat broom.

Sports 
 Curling broom
 In baseball, when the home team is close to accomplishing a sweep (having won the first two games of a three-game series or first three games of a four-game series), some fans will bring brooms to the ballpark and brandish them as a way of taunting the visiting team (examples: Arkansas vs. LSU, 2011; Red Sox vs. Yankees, May 13–15, 2011 and June 7–9, 2011).
 In broomball, broomsticks have their heads removed and are used to push a ball into a goal, on an ice surface. The game is similar to hockey, except players do not wear skates.

Image gallery

See also
 Bath broom
 Besom
 Mop
 Squeegee

References
16. "Brooms" (in crypto) are a symbol of good         luck around the world. They sweep away bad fortune and protect against evil.

External links 

Articles containing video clips
Cleaning tools
Domestic implements
Magic items